Ryan James Wilson (born December 14, 1982) is a poet, editor, translator, literary critic, and academic from Baltimore, Maryland. He is the C.F.O. and Office Manager of the Association of Literary Scholars, Critics, and Writers, editor of Literary Matters, and an award-winning poet, essayist, and literary translator. His first collection of poetry, The Stranger World, was published in June 2017. In 2019, his monograph, How to Think Like a Poet, was published by Wiseblood Books, and in 2021 his Proteus Bound: Selected Translations, 2008-2020 was published by Franciscan University Press. Ryan Wilson received an Honorable Mention for his poem For a Dog in the Rob Frost Farm Poetry contest in 2015.

Personal life
In December 1982, Wilson was born in Griffin, Georgia. He grew up in Macon, Georgia, and graduated from Tattnall Square Academy in 2000.

He earned a B.A. (English) from the University of Georgia, an M.F.A. (Poetry) from Johns Hopkins University, and an M.F.A. (Poetry) from Boston University in 2008.[1] Currently he teaches at The Catholic University of America, and he serves as the chief financial officer and Office Manager of the Association of Literary Scholars, Critics, and Writers, while also serving as editor-in-chief of Literary Matters, the association's digital literary journal, in which he has published U.S. Poet Laureate, as well as winners of the Nobel Prize in Literature, Pulitzer Prize, the National Book Award, the National Book Critics Circle Award, the MacArthur ‘Genius’ Grant, the Stegner Fellowship, the Yale Younger Poets Prize, and many more of the nation's top prizes. He lives north of Baltimore with his wife.

Publications
His works have been published in 32 Poems, Best American Poetry 2018, Birmingham Poetry Review, First Things, Five Points, The Hopkins Review, The New Criterion, The Sewanee Review, The Yale Review, and many other journals, including Poetry Daily and Verse Daily.

His first collection of poetry, The Stranger World, won the Donald Justice Poetry Prize and was published by Measure Press in June 2017. Mark Jarman said, "The Stranger World includes heartbreaking lyrics, haunting narratives, inspired translations, and finely honed satires. It is not simply consummate skill that is everywhere present in these well-wrought poems but, to echo the title of one of the best of them, authority. They are written with the authority of mastery."[2] Robert Pinsky wrote, "Ryan Wilson’s mastery of traditional forms serves a fresh, distinctive poetry of candor and meditation: soulful rather than brittle, more observant than performative. The idiomatic, American blank verse of Wilson’s 'Authority' and L’Estraneo is as fluent as that of Robert Frost, but with an oblique tenderness that reminds me of Frost’s friend Edward Thomas."

In 2019, Wiseblood Books published Wilson's monograph, How to Think Like a Poet, which was previously awarded the Jacques Maritain Prize for Non-Fiction by the journal, Dappled Things. George David Clark, editor of 32 Poems, wrote of the monograph: “With an uncommon clarity and a uniquely graceful erudition, Ryan Wilson challenges us to think faithfully about our art and artfully about our faith. Candid, eloquent, insightful, and, above all, passionately hospitable, How to Think Like a Poet invites us into poetic relationships, exchanges in which our minds creatively host the stranger-world while simultaneously enjoying that world’s lavish generosities. Ultimately, these pages offer nothing less than the radical welcome of the authentically Christian imagination.” Rachel Hadas added, “At once heartening and challenging, hortatory and inspiring, Wilson’s homiletic essay is a gentle but powerful companion on any poet’s path.”

In December 2021, Franciscan University Press published Wilson's Proteus Bound: Selected Translations, 2008-2020. Of this book, A.E. Stallings has written: “This anthology of lyric poems and passages of epic, from antiquity to the 20th century, from Greek, Latin, Italian, French, German, Spanish, and Portuguese, represents a sweeping literary education unto itself.” Fred Chappell noted, “These translations are respectful but not staid, accurate but not persnickety, renewing but not distorting,” and David Ferry added, “Wilson’s choices are always responsible and responsive, as manifested in the elegant music of his versification.” Former Chancellor of the Academy of American Poets, Rosanna Warren, wrote: “One feels a lifetime of poetic art bound between the covers of this book. Both Ryan Wilson’s lifetime—years of dedicated, disciplined, and devoted skill went into making this varying music for so many different voices—and the larger lifetime of the poetry of the West, the Classical tradition from Homer, Alcman, and Sappho to Trakl and Georg Heym. The elegance of Wilson’s verse is breathtaking: Horatian, really—alacrity, subtlety, wit, naturalness. This book is a civilization. May it enlighten and delight many.”

Awards
 Sankey Prize for Excellence in Poetry (Johns Hopkins University).
 Shmuel Traum Prize (Boston University).
 Eleanor Clark Award (Robert Penn Warren Circle), winner.
 Jacques Maritain Prize (Dappled Things), winner, 2015.
 Walter Sullivan Prize for Promise in Criticism (The Sewanne Review), winner, 2016.
 Donald Justice Poetry Prize, winner, 2017.

Further reading 
  – Beltway Poetry Quarterly showcases the literary community in Washington, D.C., and the surrounding Mid-Atlantic region.

External links 

 Ryan Wilson – Poet

,

20th-century American poets
21st-century American poets
1982 births
Living people
Johns Hopkins University alumni
University of Georgia alumni
Boston University College of Arts and Sciences alumni
Writers from Macon, Georgia
People from Griffin, Georgia
Writers from Baltimore
American chief financial officers